Dysprosium(III) bromide is an inorganic compound of bromine and dysprosium, with the chemical formula of DyBr3.

Preparation 

Dysprosium(III) bromide can be obtained by reacting dysprosium with bromine:
2Dy + 3Br2 → 2DyBr3

Dysprosium bromide hexahydrate can be obtained by crystallization from its solution, which can be heated with ammonium bromide in vacuum to obtain the anhydrous form.

Dysprosium(III) oxide and aluminium bromide (in the form of Al2Br6 at a high temperature react a DyAl3Br12, which decomposes to dysprosium(III) bromide at a lower temperature:
 Dy2O3 + Al2Br6 → Al2O3 + 2 DyBr3

Properties 

Dysprosium(III) bromide is a white-gray hygroscopic solid that is soluble in water. It has a trigonal crystal structure of the bismuth(III) iodide type with space group R3 (No. 148).

References 

Dysprosium compounds
Bromides
Lanthanide halides